Ette may refer to:

Ette (river), a river of Baden-Württemberg, Germany
Exotic Tropic Timber Enterprises, a company in Liberia
Bernard Etté (1898–1973), German jazz and light music violinist and conductor
Ottmar Ette (born 1956), Professor of Romance languages and Comparative literature at the University of Potsdam, Germany
Carla J. Easton, a musician who released her first solo album under the name Ette
-ette, a diminutive suffix